Interstate 88 (I-88) is an Interstate Highway located entirely within the US state of New York. The freeway serves as an important connector route from the Capital District to Binghamton, Elmira (via New York State Route 17 or NY 17, I-86), and Scranton, Pennsylvania (via I-81). I-88 closely parallels NY 7, which was once the main route through the area.

I-88 was assigned in 1968, and construction of the highway began soon afterward. The first section of I-88 opened in the early 1970s, connecting two communities northeast of Binghamton. The last piece of the freeway was finished in 1989, linking the original segment to I-81 north of Binghamton. Early plans for I-88 called for the road to continue northeast to Troy; however, the east end of the route was moved to Schenectady in the early 1980s. A combined freeway/tollway in Illinois, though not contiguous, was also assigned the I-88 designation in 1987.

Route description

Binghamton to Oneonta

I-88 begins at an interchange with I-81 just north of Downtown Binghamton on the banks of the Chenango River. While both directions of I-81 are accessible from I-88 westbound, only one direction of I-81 (northbound) connects to I-88. The missing connection, I-81 south to I-88 east, is made via US Route 11 (US 11), NY 12, and NY 12A at I-81 exit 6. NY 12A then connects to I-88 at exit 2.

From I-81, I-88 heads east across the Chenango to Port Dickinson, where it merges with NY 7 (here also a limited-access highway) at exit 1. The two routes continue north, then east along the eastern bank of the Chenango River, where it meets NY 12A near Chenango Bridge. I-88 and NY 7 remain alongside the river to Port Crane, where the river begins to follow NY 369 (exit 3) northward. Outside of Port Crane, the expressway heads east to Sanitaria Springs. Here, NY 7 leaves the expressway at exit 4 and begins to parallel I-88, as it does for the remainder of I-88's routing. I-88 begins to climb a hill, with the eastbound lane having three lanes then soon meets Martin Hill Road (NY 992P) at exit 5.

I-88 continues east to Harpursville, connecting to NY 79 near the center of the community at exit 6. Shortly after meeting NY 79, I-88 reenters a river valley, this time that of the Susquehanna River. I-88 heads to the northeast, following the river and NY 7 to Afton where it has an interchange with NY 41 exit 7. It continues to Bainbridge where it meets NY 206 and then on to Sidney, where it meets NY 8, the primary north–south road through the village, at exit 9. From Sidney, I-88 progresses northeast through southern Otsego County. It passes Unadilla, accessed by exit 10, then connects to NY 357 at exit 11. The expressway continues and reaches exit 12 which connects to Otego via NY 911J. It continues northeastward before entering Oneonta. Within the city, I-88 interchanges with NY 205 ahead of exit 14 with Main Street, which is the former routing of NY 28. The next interchange I-88 intersects NY 23 and NY 28 joins the expressway, following I-88 out of the city.

Oneonta to Schenectady
Northeast of Oneonta, NY 28 leaves I-88 at exit 17 to follow the Susquehanna River northward toward Cooperstown. I-88, however, remains on a northeasterly track through rural eastern Otsego County. Upon crossing into Schoharie County, I-88 begins to follow an easterly routing as it heads toward Cobleskill. While NY 7 enters the village, I-88 passes south of it, connecting to the village via two exits with NY 7. East of Cobleskill, I-88 interchanges with NY 145. Howe Caverns, a regionally popular attraction, is located a short distance north of the exit. I-88 continues onward, skirting the northern edge of Schoharie before passing into Schenectady County.

Shortly after entering Schenectady County, I-88 meets US 20 east of Duanesburg. Past US 20, I-88 continues northeast, interchanging with NY 7 for one final time before ending at the New York State Thruway (I-90) in western Schenectady.

History
The 1956 National System of Interstate and Defense Highways Act did not include I-88. New York state officials pressed for addition of the route, and funding was included in the Federal-Aid Highway Act of 1968. Right-of-way acquisition started immediately afterward, and I-88 was added to the Interstate Highway System on December 13, 1968. As originally planned by the New York State Department of Transportation (NYSDOT), I-88 would begin at I-81 in Binghamton and follow the proposed Susquehanna Expressway to Schenectady, from where it would continue to US 4 in Troy over "Alternate Route 7", the limited-access alignment of NY 7 through the northern suburbs of Albany. This would have been accomplished by having I-88 meet the New York State Thruway at exit 25, where it would connect to I-890. I-88 would continue to Troy over I-890 and an upgraded NY 7.

In the early 1980s, the proposed connection with I-890 was scrapped in favor of a connection located to the west of exit 25 in Rotterdam. The extension to Troy was also eventually shelved, and thus the planned connections to the Adirondack Northway (I-87) and the toll-free part of I-90 between Thruway exit 24 and exit B1 on the Berkshire Connector were never built. As a result, the Thruway tolls are waived for all traffic that enters at exit 25A and heads west to exit 26 (I-890) or east to either exit 25 or 24 (I-890 or I-87/I-90, respectively).

The first section of I-88 to open was the piece between Chenango Bridge (exit 2) and Sanitaria Springs (exit 4), which opened in the early 1970s. A second piece near Oneonta between exits 13 and 15 was opened to traffic . Construction progressed southwestward from Oneonta, with the freeway reaching Nineveh (exit 6) by 1977. The gap between Sanitaria Springs and Nineveh was filled by 1981. The focus then moved to the section of the expressway between Oneonta and Schenectady, which was completed from Oneonta to Duanesburg (exit 24) by 1981. The Duanesburg–Schenectady leg of I-88 was opened to traffic by 1985. In 1989, construction concluded on I-88 with the opening of the final portion of I-88 between I-81 in Chenango and NY 7 in Chenango Bridge.

In 1999 NYSDOT, the Federal Highway Administration (FHWA) and the New York State Thruway Authority (NYSTA) discussed redesignating the Berkshire Connector as I-90 and redesignating the nontoll part of I-90 from Thruway exit 24 to exit B1 on the Berkshire Connector as I-88. The section of the Thruway between exits 25 and 24 would then be codesignated as I-90 and I-88. This was never implemented.

2006 flood

As a result of the June 2006 flooding in Upstate New York and Northeastern Pennsylvania, Carrs Creek washed out a  section of I-88 southwest of Unadilla on June 28. Around 6:20 am, two trucks from different directions drove into the chasm, apparently unaware of it, killing both drivers. David Swingle, 42, of Waverly, who was driving eastbound, was identified shortly after the accident. The westbound trucker was Patrick O'Connell, 55, of Lisbon, Maine. His body was found downstream several days after the water receded.

NYSDOT started construction to replace the section of highway almost immediately, and it was reopened August 31. Families of both victims planned to sue the state of New York for the incidents.

Exit list

See also

References

External links

88 east
88
Transportation in Broome County, New York
Transportation in Chenango County, New York
Transportation in Delaware County, New York
Transportation in Otsego County, New York
Transportation in Schoharie County, New York
Transportation in Schenectady County, New York